USS Craighead (AK-175) was an  commissioned by the U.S. Navy for service in World War II. She was responsible for delivering troops, goods and equipment to locations in the war zone.

Construction
Craighead was launched 28 February 1945, by Froemming Brothers, Inc., Milwaukee, Wisconsin, under a Maritime Commission contract, MC hull 2148; sponsored by Mrs. W. R. Provoost; transferred to the Navy 31 July 1945; and commissioned 5 September 1945.

Service history

Post-World War II activity
Craighead sailed from Galveston, Texas, 25 September 1945 and arrived at Davisville, Rhode Island, 4 October to load cargo for construction battalions on the US West Coast. She sailed from Davisville 25 October, arriving at San Pedro, California, 15 November. After sailing on cargo duty between Port Hueneme, San Pedro, and San Francisco, California, she sailed 14 December 1945 for Norfolk, Virginia, where she arrived 5 January 1946.

Post-war decommissioning
Craighead was decommissioned 18 January 1946 and returned to the Maritime Commission the same day for disposal.

Merchant service
Craighead was sold to the Republic of Turkey in 1947, for $693,862. She was transferred to the shipping company of Deniz Nakliyati T.A.O., Istanbul, Turkey, and renamed Kastamonu and reflagged to Turkish. Along with her sister ships, ex-, renamed Kars, ex-, renamed Malatya, and ex-, renamed Rize, she would, for the next 15 years, provide cargo service between Turkey and Northern Europe. She was finally broken up in the Turkish port of Aliağa in January 1984.

Notes 

Citations

Bibliography 

Online resources

External links

 

Alamosa-class cargo ships
Craighead County, Arkansas
Ships built in Milwaukee
1945 ships
World War II auxiliary ships of the United States